Ben Passmore (born 1983) is an American comics artist and political cartoonist.

Early life 
Born and raised in Great Barrington, Massachusetts, Passmore attended art school at Savannah College of Art and Design where he majored in comics with a minor in illustration.

Career 
Passmore's works, ranging from the fantastical to the autobiographical, contain social commentary on politics, activism, white supremacy, the United States, sports, and the experience of black Americans. He is a frequent contributor to the comics publication The Nib. His book, Your Black Friend, was originally self-published in 2016 and then reissued by Silver Sprocket in 2018. The book is a collection of short vignettes offering the experiences of a black man in a world of white people. Your Black Friend was Inspired by Black Skin, White Masks, Frantz Fanon's 1952 book about the impacts of racism. The book has been compared to the Jimbo comic strip by Gary Panter. Passmore's book won the 2017 Ignatz Award for Outstanding Comic, received an Eisner Award nomination that year for Best Single-Issue, and was featured on NPR's list of 100 favorite comics and graphic novels.  The work has been adapted into a short animated film.

Publications 
 Sports is Hell, published by Koyama Press in February 2020. The book is a satire about the breakout of a violent revolution during the Super Bowl, using football to explore themes of racism, resistance, white supremacy, allyship, identity, and alienation. It won the Eisner Award for Best Single Issue/One Shot in 2021. The book appears on The 100 Best Comics of the Decade List created by The Beat. 
 BTTM FDRS, published with Ezra Claytan Daniels in February 2019 by Fantagraphics Books. The publisher describes the book as an "Afrofuturist horror-comedy about gentrification, hip hop, and cultural appropriation."
 DAYGLOAYHOLE was written while Passmore lived in New Orleans. It is a quarterly web-comic series published in 2017 and 2018 by Silver Sprocket Bicycle Club. It follows two characters, including Passmore as himself, wandering around a post-apocalyptic New Orleans.  It was nominated for an Ignatz Outstanding Series Award in 2019.

References 

Living people
1983 births
Ignatz Award winners
African-American comics creators
American comics writers
African-American writers
American comics artists
Savannah College of Art and Design alumni
American caricaturists
21st-century African-American people
20th-century African-American people